Democratic Republic of the Congo competed at the 2014 Summer Youth Olympics, in Nanjing, China from 16 August to 28 August 2014.

Athletics

Democratic Republic of the Congo qualified two athletes.

Qualification Legend: Q=Final A (medal); qB=Final B (non-medal); qC=Final C (non-medal); qD=Final D (non-medal); qE=Final E (non-medal)

Boys
Field Events

Girls
Track & road events

Swimming

Democratic Republic of the Congo qualified one swimmer.

Boys

Taekwondo

Democratic Republic of the Congo was given a wild card to compete.

Girls

References

You
Nations at the 2014 Summer Youth Olympics
Democratic Republic of the Congo at the Youth Olympics